Regöly is a village in Tolna county, Hungary.

References

Populated places in Tolna County